The following highways are numbered 625:

Canada

Costa Rica
 National Route 625

United Kingdom
A625 road

United States